Highway 377 is a highway in the Canadian province of Saskatchewan. It runs from Highway 6 near Ceylon to Highway 28 near Radville and Riverside.

Highway 377 passes near the Ceylon Regional Park.

References

377